N-Force is an English dance music act that formed in 2008.

Career
The act comprises Lois McConnell as lead singer, plus Jorg Schmid and Chris Henry. N-Force is currently signed to UK Dance label All Around the World, and have so far released six singles in the UK and Germany. N-Force's tracks have appeared on various Clubland compilation CDs. Some of their songs have attained some mild success in the UK and Germany. One of their songs, "All My Life" has accumulated over 6,000,000 views as of October, 2011 on YouTube.

Schmid has stated that there are more "N-Force" songs to come, but it is unknown if McConnell will still front the act, as she seems to be developing a solo career. However a new single entitled "The One" surfaced in 2011, which still had McConnells's vocals.

Discography

Singles

As a featured artist

References

English dance music groups
Musical groups established in 2008